Balabhadra Majhi is an Indian politician. He was elected to the 16th Lok Sabha in 2014 from Nabarangpur constituency in Odisha. He is a member of the Bhartiya Janta Party since  March 2019.

Career 

He graduated in B.Sc. (Engineering)-Civil, from NIT Rourkela and served as a Chief Executive Engineer in the Railways until 2014, when he resigned from government service where he had 7 years remaining for retirement to contest the Lok Sabha elections for his constituency.

He was a member of the Biju Janata Dal political party and elected to the 16th Lok Sabha in 2014 from Nabarangpur constituency as member of the Biju Janata Dal candidate. But in 2014 Indian general election, Biju Janata Dal denied a ticket to him. He joined Bhartiya Janta Party in March 2019 and was given ticket from the same constituency but lost to state minister Ramesh Chandra Majhi of Biju Janata Dal.

See also

 Indian general election, 2014 (Odisha)

References

External links
 Info at MyNeta.com

Living people
Lok Sabha members from Odisha
India MPs 2014–2019
Members of the Odisha Legislative Assembly
People from Nabarangpur district
1961 births
Biju Janata Dal politicians
Bharatiya Janata Party politicians from Odisha